Musa Bihi Abdi (born 1948 in Hargeisa, British Somaliland, now Somaliland) is a Somaliland politician and former military officer who has been President of Somaliland since December 2017. During the 1970s, he served as a pilot in the Somali Air Force under the Siad Barre administration. In 2010, Bihi was appointed the Chairman of the ruling Kulmiye of Republic of Somaliland. In November 2015, Bihi was selected as the party's Presidential Candidate at the 5th annual central committee convention.

On 21 November 2017 Muse Bihi was announced the winner of the 2017 presidential election. He officially became the President of Somaliland on 13 December 2017.

Early life
Muse Bihi was born in the outskirts of Hargeisa in 1948, then part of the British Somaliland protectorate. He attended Amoud Secondary School, which he graduated from in 1970.

Military career
He joined the Somali Air Force in 1970 and trained to be an officer in the Soviet Union until 1973, where he graduated with a bachelor’s degree from the Academy of Pilots in Dushanbe, modern-day Tajikistan. Upon the completion of the training he was stationed in air bases in Baledogle, Baidoa as well as the air force's main base in Mogadishu.

From 1981 to 1985 Muse Bihi received further military training in the United States, including at the Wright-Patterson Air Force Base near Dayton, Ohio from 1981 to 1982, as well as Fort Lee in Virginia from 1983 to 1985.

In 1985, he defected from the Somali Army and joined the rebel Somali National Movement (SNM) that eventually helped to successfully oust the Somali dictator’s regime during the Somaliland War of Independence in 1991.

From 1985 to 1988 Bihi took part in conducting intensive guerrilla war operations conducted by the SNM during the Somaliland War of Independence against the Siad Barre regime. Until 1990, Bihi served as rebel commander before joining politics and serving as home affairs minister under the late President Muhammad Haji Ibrahim Egal in 1994.

Political career

Somali Democratic Republic 
From 1973 to 1985 Muse Bihi held high ranking positions in the government of the Somali Democratic Republic, including the head of the training department of the Somali Air Force as well as the military attaché of the Somali embassy in Washington.

Egal administration
After the rebirth and declaration of Independence of Somaliland in 1991, Col. Muse Bihi Abdi played a vital role in the reconciliation process of the Somaliland clans in Burao, Berbera, Sheekh and Borama.

In 1993, Bihi served as Minister of Interior and National Security in late President Muhammad Haji Ibrahim Egal's government.

Silanyo administration
In 2010, Bihi became the chairman of Somaliland’s Kulmiye Party, after serving as the vice chairman of the party from 2008. In 2015, Bihi was elected by the Party Congress as the Kulmiye presidential candidate in the forthcoming 2017 presidential election.

2017 presidential election
The 2017 Somaliland presidential elections were held on 13 November 2017. On 21 November Bihi was announced as the winner of the election, becoming President-elect of Somaliland.

Presidency

Muse Bihi Abdi was officially sworn in as the 5th President of the Republic of Somaliland on 13 December 2017 in the capital Hargeisa with dignitaries from Ethiopia, Djibouti, the European Union and the United Kingdom in attendance.

Personal life
Muse Bihi has two wives and seven children, three sons and four daughters.

References

1948 births
21st-century presidents of Somaliland
21st-century Somaliland politicians
Ethnic Somali people
Peace, Unity, and Development Party politicians
Living people
People from Hargeisa
Presidents of Somaliland
Somaliland politicians